The 19th Annual 24 Hour Pepsi Challenge Daytona was a 24-hour sports car and GT race held on January 31 – February 1, 1982 at the Daytona International Speedway road course. The race served as the opening round of the 1981 World Sportscar Championship and the 1981 IMSA GTX, GTO and GTU Championships. It was the last 24 Hours of Daytona to be part of the World Sportscar Championship. When the World Endurance Championship started in 2012 it would race in the United States at Sebring International Raceway and the Circuit of the Americas.

Victory overall and in the GTX class went to the No. 9 Garretson Racing Porsche 935 K3 driven by Bob Garretson, Bobby Rahal, and Brian Redman by the large margin of 13 laps over the similar No. 5 Porsche 935 K3 of the Bob Akin Motor Racing team driven by Bob Akin, Craig Siebert and Derek Bell Victory in the GTU Class and third outright was the No. 62 Kegel Enterprises Porsche 911 SC driven by Bill Koll, Jeff Kline and Rob McFarlin by 18 laps over the No. 23 Datsun 280ZX of Dick Davenport, Frank Carney and Rameau Johnson. Victory in the GTO class and sixth outright went to the No. 14 Bavarian Motors International BMW M1 driven by Walter Brun, Hans-Joachim Stuck and Alf Gebhardt by 23 laps over the No. 58 Porsche 911 Carrera RSR driven by Pete Smith, Chuck Kendall and Steve Earle.

Race results

References

24 Hours of Daytona
1981 in sports in Florida
1981 in American motorsport
Daytona